Nicolás Ecequiel Dibble Aristimuño (born 27 May 1994) is a Uruguayan professional footballer who plays as a forward for Vitória.

Career
Dibble had various youth clubs, he started with Peñarol which came before spells with Plaza Colonia, Juventud, Nacional de Montevideo, Nacional de Nueva Helvecia and Defensor Sporting prior to rejoining Plaza Colonia. He made his professional football debut in 2013 with Plaza Colonia in the Uruguayan Segunda División, making his bow in a 1–1 draw with Deportivo Maldonado on 12 October. Twenty-six more appearances followed in 2013–14, prior to fifty in 2014–15 and 2015–16. In 2014–15, Dibble scored four goals, including his first against Rocha in December 2014, in a season that ended with promotion.

In July 2016, Dibble joined ex-youth club Peñarol on loan. He scored on his debut in a 2–0 victory over Fénix. He went on to feature twenty-five more times and scored four further goals. On 23 August 2017, Dibble was loaned to Argentine Primera División side Gimnasia y Esgrima. His first Gimnasia y Esgrima goal arrived on 29 October in a 4–0 win at home to Vélez Sarsfield.

Career statistics
.

References

External links

1994 births
Living people
People from Colonia del Sacramento
Uruguayan footballers
Association football forwards
Uruguayan expatriate footballers
Expatriate footballers in Argentina
Uruguayan expatriate sportspeople in Argentina
Uruguayan Segunda División players
Uruguayan Primera División players
Argentine Primera División players
Plaza Colonia players
Peñarol players
Club de Gimnasia y Esgrima La Plata footballers